Deinis Suárez Laguardia (born March 13, 1984 in Havana) is a Cuban right-handed pitcher who is currently a free agent.

Suárez pitched for Industriales of the Cuban National Series and the Cuban national baseball team. He was part of the Cuban roster for the 2006 World Baseball Classic.

Suárez was 8-3 with a 3.55 ERA for Industriales during the 2005-06 season.

Suárez defected from Cuba and signed with the Minnesota Twins in April 2011. He pitched in 2011 for the New Britain Rock Cats of the Class-AA Eastern League and Rochester Red Wings of the Class-AAA International League.

See also

List of baseball players who defected from Cuba

References

External links

1984 births
Living people
Defecting Cuban baseball players
Baseball pitchers
2006 World Baseball Classic players
New Britain Rock Cats players
Rochester Red Wings players
Southern Maryland Blue Crabs players
Baseball players from Havana